This article is about the list of most populated towns in Andhra Pradesh state of India as per 2011 Census of India, conducted by The Office of the Registrar General and Census Commissioner, under Ministry of Home Affairs, Government of India.

List of towns 

As per 2011 Census of India, settlements with population of less than 100,000 are called Towns.

Yemmiganur is the most populated city with a population of 95,149.

The Towns written in bold are the headquarters of their respective district.

Gallery

Sources 
Source: STATISTICAL INFORMATION OF ULBs & UDAs  also Office of the Registrar General and Census Commissioner (web), Delimitation Commission of India (web), Rand McNally International Atlas 1994, School of Planning & Architecture (web) - https://www.citypopulation.de/php/india-andhrapradesh.php

https://censusindia.gov.in/2011census/dchb/2811_PART_A_DCHB_SRIKAKULAM.pdf

https://censusindia.gov.in/2011census/dchb/2812_PART_A_DCHB_VIZIANAGARAM.pdf

https://censusindia.gov.in/2011census/dchb/2813_PART_A_DCHB_VISAKHAPATNAM.pdf

https://censusindia.gov.in/2011census/dchb/2814_PART_A_DCHB_EAST%20GODAVARI.pdf

https://censusindia.gov.in/2011census/dchb/2815_PART_A_DCHB_WEST%20GODAVARI.pdf

https://censusindia.gov.in/2011census/dchb/2816_PART_A_DCHB_KRISHNA.pdf

https://censusindia.gov.in/2011census/dchb/2817_PART_A_DCHB_GUNTUR.pdf

https://censusindia.gov.in/2011census/dchb/2818_PART_A_DCHB_PRAKASAM.pdf

https://censusindia.gov.in/2011census/dchb/2819_PART_A_DCHB_SRI%20POTTI%20SRIIAMULU%20NELLORE.pdf

https://censusindia.gov.in/2011census/dchb/2823_PART_A_DCHB_CHITTOOR.pdf

https://censusindia.gov.in/2011census/dchb/2820_PART_A_DCHB_YSR.pdf

https://censusindia.gov.in/2011census/dchb/2821_PART_A_DCHB_KURNOOL.pdf

https://censusindia.gov.in/2011census/dchb/2822_PART_A_DCHB_ANANTAPUR.pdf

https://www.newindianexpress.com/states/andhra-pradesh/2013/feb/11/22-villages-may-be-included-in-rajahmundry-soon-449459.html

http://smartcities.gov.in/upload/uploadfiles/files/AndraPradesh_Kakinada.pdf

https://timesofindia.indiatimes.com/city/vijayawada/CRDA-eyes-CSR-funds-to-push-job-potential-in-capital-city/articleshow/47891827.cms

See also 
List of urban agglomerations in Andhra Pradesh
List of cities in India by population
List of municipalities in Andhra Pradesh

Notes

References 

https://www.deccanchronicle.com/nation/current-affairs/300517/ap-to-develop-14-smart-cities-across-state.html

Lists of populated places in Andhra Pradesh
Andhra Pradesh